Straitsman may refer to:

MV Straitsman (2005), former Danish ferry in New Zealand
MV Straitsman (1972), capsized 1974